Elena Yakovlevna Sheynina, (1965 Kharkiv, is a modern Ukrainian children's writer, publicist, culturologist. She writes in Ukrainian and in Russian. She is Mother-heroine (has seven children).

Biography

Elena Sheynina  graduated secondary school in 1982. After school she studied during 5 semesters engineering science in one of the best soviet technical higher school The Kharkiv Polytechnic Institute National Technical University (NTU "KhPI") (()), in the city of Kharkiv. Then she decided to strongly change her study direction. She began to study music and 1991 graduated from Moscow state university of culture and art, the chair of choral conducting.

During 1990s years Elena Sheynina taught music in different secondary schools in Kharkiv.

Since 1998 Elena Sheynina has devoted himself to literary work. She writes books for children. And also she is well known as culturologist for her book "Encyclopedia of symbols" and for a whole number of articles about school, education, psychology of education and pedagogy.

Her interest to the art, literature, music and at whole to culture is nonrandom. She had been taking part many years in the Literature Studio under leading of Honoured teacher of Ukraine Alexandr Okhrimenko and in the City Literature Studio for children in Kharkiv under leading of well noted children's writer Vadim Levin.

Works

Books

 "Encyclopedia of symbols", 2001, 2002, 2006 (АСТ, ФОЛИО, Торсинг)
  Lessons for parents (together with Vadim Levin. – Харьков: Фолио, 2000).
 Winter Ukrainian holidays (together with E. Levinshtein).
 Encyclopedia for girls (together with E. Levinshtein).
 Computer for children (Eksmo, 2005)  (Эксмо, 2005)
  Nativity scene (2007)
 Personal computer for school. Training course. (Эксмо, 2007)
 The myths and legends of Ukrainians (Харьков: Торсінг, 2009)
 Heroes Of Ukraine (Харьков: Торсінг, 2011)
 Education in search of a shape: articles on the problems of education and upbringing (Altaspera Publishing and Literary Agency, 2014).

Series of books "My first encyclopedia"

 The wonderful world of objects (Эксмо, 2012)
 Our planet Earth (Эксмо, 2011)
 Seasons (Эксмо, 2011)
 Musical instruments (Eksmo, 2011) (Эксмо, 2011)
 Profession (Eksmo, 2011) (Эксмо, 2011)
 Flags of the world (Eksmo, 2011) (Эксмо, 2011)
 Trees (Eksmo, 2011) (Эксмо, 2011)

Compiler of books:

 The Princess and the Pea (together with Vadim Levin and other Дрофа, 1999)
 The children's library "Ladder " (Детская библиотека "Лесенка", 20 Volumes). (Together with: Vadim Levin and other, 1994.

Articles:

 Children's rights: a tribute to the popular rhetoric or social weapon?  (Права детей: дань модной риторике или социальное оружие?))
 The ideal teacher (Идеальный учитель)
 System of Sukhomlinsky and modern school: reflections in the year of the 90th anniversary of the teacher (Система Сухомлинского и современная школа: размышления в год 90-летия педагога)
 The worst handwriting in the classroom (Самый худший почерк в классе)
 Communication in the school as a system of relations (Комунікація у школі як система взаємин)
 Not by bread alone… (Не хлібом єдиним...)

References

External links 
 Personal website of Elena Sheynina
 Книга «Рождественский вертеп» - сказка, которая ожила 
 Шейнина Елена Яковлевна

1965 births
Ukrainian children's writers
Living people
Kharkiv Polytechnic Institute alumni
Writers from Kharkiv
Ukrainian schoolteachers